Edward W. McNally (January 2, 1900 – November 21, 1968) was an American politician from Cambria County, Pennsylvania. A member of the Democratic Party, McNally served in the Pennsylvania House of Representatives from 1961 until his death in 1968.

Professional career
After graduating from Carnegie Institute of Technology (now Carnegie-Mellon University) in Pittsburgh, McNally served in a variety of managerial positions. He served as president and treasurer of McNally Tire and Rubber Company, and was a past director of Johnstown Hockey Company.

Political career and death
McNally originally represented Cambria County in the State House (by holding one of the county's allotted at-large seats). While serving in the House, he sat on both the Liquor Control and Highway Committees.

Following the constitutional changes of 1968, which reorganized House seats into numbered districts, McNally was elected to represent the new 72nd District. However, he died on November 21, 1968, sixteen days after his election to the seat, following a heart attack. The ensuing special election for the seat was won by Democrat John Murtha.

Personal life
McNally was married to Clara Hoffman, and had one daughter, Sally.

References

Democratic Party members of the Pennsylvania House of Representatives
1900 births
1968 deaths
Politicians from Pittsburgh
Carnegie Mellon University alumni
20th-century American politicians